Claude Jeancolas (1949 – 10 February 2016) was a French writer, art historian and journalist. He is best known for his work on Arthur Rimbaud.

Life 
His entire childhood and adolescence was spent in Nancy, in the east of France. At the age of 16 he left for Paris with his Baccalaureate diploma in his pocket. There he continued his studies in a preparatory class for the "grandes écoles". He entered the École Supérieure de Commerce of Paris (ESCP). He also has a degree from the Business School of the University of Texas where he continued his studies. He wrote his thesis on management of the American press. He was also a visiting scholar in various American universities including UCLA, Stanford University, the University of California at Berkeley, San Francisco State University, the School of Journalism in Columbia Missouri, and Columbia University in New York... As of this time his time was divided between the press and writing. He died on 17 February 2016.

Journalism career 
He began his career as the head of the financial analysis department of the weekly magazine Entreprise; he then created two management journals: Enseignement et gestion and the Revue Française de Gestion. After that he took over the head of the avant-garde monthly Mode international. Several years later he edited the magazines Collections, Décoration, and Mariages. He moved to Votre Beauté, a magazine that François Mitterrand edited at the beginning of his career. He later joined the Hachette Group, which is now the Lagardère Group, as international editor of Elle (four editions created worldwide) and Elle Décoration (14 editions created worldwide). He also created Cousteau Junior and Max. He was until 2012 the director of Marie Claire maison and Marie Claire travel magazines in Milan.

Art historian career 
This interest for art came to be in 1969 after his meeting with the sculptor Edmond Moirignot, with whom he became a friend, later his guardian, and now the executor of his will. He published an important monograph on the sculptor Jean-Baptiste Carpeaux in 1987. Intensive studies on the history of sculpture and French drawing followed. More recently he published two books on the Nabis and the Fauves, that is, those schools or movements that catapulted art into modernism at the turn of the century.

Rimbaud 
This is how Raphaël Sorin presented him in l'Express when his Dictionnaire Rimbaud came out in 1991. A late calling though: after quoting a quotation of Arthur to his professor Izambard in an editorial in Max—the magazine that he directed at the time, he received so much mail that he decided to go into more depth on the subject. He continues to do so—publishing his findings on a regular basis. His vision of Rimbaud is far from the usual clichés of the damned poet. According to him, the poet is too intelligent (the best in his class) to be incoherent. His poems always have a meaning, are coherent, and have a mission. Rimbaud is determined and wilful.  He completely gives himself over to poetry because he is certain that it can be life changing. Une Saison en enfer, which is a quest for salvation, is also a written essay of a new bible for modern times. The poetry is thus a means and not an end, a tool, at the service of a very spiritual and humanist ideal. So, when he finds himself persuaded of its inefficiency—it being much slower than he had hoped—he discards it and moves on to something else. The vision of Claude Jeancolas is very human, and his Rimbaud, with his dreams, doubts, anger, lassitude and failures is brought closer to the reader, which explains the success of this biography with the general public. He has also redeemed his well criticised mother, Vitalie Rimbaud, in a biography that shows the intense love that attached this mother to her preferred child; and conversely, the necessity of this mother for Rimbaud to be able to become the man that we know.

Bibliography 
Main publications :
1985
 Moirignot. Éditions du St Gothard. Paris
1987
 Carpeaux peintre et sculpteur. Edita. Lausanne
1991
 La Sculpture italienne du XXe siècle. Éditions Van Wilder. Paris
 Les Voyages de Rimbaud. Balland. Paris
 Le Dictionnaire Rimbaud. Balland. Paris
1993
 La Sculpture française. Fabbri. Milan
1995
 Le Dessin en France de la renaissance au XXe siècle. Rizzoli. Milan.
1996
 L'œuvre intégrale manuscrite de Rimbaud. Textuel. Paris
1997
 Le Don du père. Flammarion. Paris
 Les Lettres manuscrites de Rimbaud. Textuel. Paris
1998
 Lettres et poèmes de Rimbaud. L'auberge verte. Paris
 Une saison en enfer de Rimbaud. Hachette. Paris
 Passion Rimbaud. Textuel. Paris
1999
 Poésies de Rimbaud. Éditions mille et une nuits. Paris
 Rimbaud, la biographie. Flammarion. Paris
 Venise et ses peintres. Une histoire intime. Éditions Van Wilder. Paris
 L'Afrique de Rimbaud. Textuel. Paris
2000
 Rimbaud, l'œuvre. Textuel. Paris
2002
 La Peinture des Nabis. Éditions fvw. Paris
2004
 Vitalie Rimbaud, pour l'amour d'un fils. biographie. Flammarion
 Rimbaud après Rimbaud, anthologie. Textuel. Paris
2005
 Rimbaud, l'œuvre, la vie. Éditions France Loisirs
2006
 Les Fauves, couleurs et lumières. Éditions FVW. Paris
 Moirignot, la vie, l'œuvre, le catalogue raisonné. Éditions FVW. Paris
2007
 Le regard bleu d'Arthur Rimbaud. Éditions FVW. Paris
2008 in collaboration 
 Fierté de fer with Joël Alessandra et Idriss Youssouf Elmi. Éditions Paquet. Genève
 L'aube du monde with Thibaut et Pascal Villecroix, Amina Saïd Chiré - FVW. Paris
2008
 Le Retour à Tadjoura – l'Afrique secrète de Jean-François Deniau – FVW. Paris
Many of those were translated in German, Korean, Japanese and English.

References

1949 births
French journalists
Writers from Nancy, France
2016 deaths
French male non-fiction writers